Ashmita Karnani (born Rajasthan) is an Indian artist and actress. She mostly works in Telugu serials. She acted in more than 15 serials and films in the Telugu film industry. She made her television debut in a Telugu serial called Padmavyuham and also acted in films such as Murari, Apudapudu, Madhumasam, Aapadhamokkulavaadu, Athithi and Collecter gari Bharya. She also appeared in commercials.

Early life 
Asmitha was born in Rajasthan in 1981.She is married to choreographer Sudhir. She started a youtube channel named Ashtrixx in 2017. The content of this channel is about girls skin care, hair care, daily vlogs, etc..

Tv serials

Filmography

References

Living people
Indian film actresses
Year of birth missing (living people)